Tuscaloosa is the name of two places in the United States of America, named after the Native American chief, Tuskaloosa:
 Tuscaloosa, Alabama
 Tuscaloosa County, Alabama

Music
 Tuscaloosa (album), a 2019 live album by Neil Young and the Stray Gators

Film
 Tuscaloosa (film), a 2019 American film starring Natalia Dyer

U.S. military vessels
 USS Tuscaloosa (CA-37), U.S. Navy New Orleans-class heavy cruiser
 USS Tuscaloosa (LST-1187), U.S. Navy Newport-class of tank landing ships (LST)